College of Health Professions may refer to:
A school at Rosalind Franklin University
Towson University College of Health Professions
New York College of Health Professions
Dr. Ezekial R. Dumke College of Health Professions
A school at Mercer University
VCU College of Health Professions